Joshua Chelanga (born 7 April 1973 in Baringo District) is a Kenyan long-distance runner who won the 2007 edition of the Rotterdam Marathon on April 15, clocking 2:08:21.

His younger brother, Samuel Chelanga, is also a long-distance runner who won the NCAA Men's Cross Country Championship in 2009 and 2010.

Achievements

Marathons 
2001 - Boston Marathon - 3rd
2002 - Commonwealth Games - 2nd
2004 - Berlin Marathon - 3rd (time 2:07:05, personal best)
2005 - Seoul International Marathon - 8th
2005 - Berlin Marathon - 4th
2006 - Paris Marathon - 26th
2006 - Eindhoven Marathon - 12th
2007 - Rotterdam Marathon - 1st
2007 - JoongAng Seoul Marathon - 1st 
2009 - Rotterdam Marathon - 14th

References

External links
The World Cross Country Championships 1973-2005
Marathoninfo

1973 births
Living people
Kenyan male long-distance runners
Kenyan male marathon runners
Athletes (track and field) at the 2002 Commonwealth Games
Commonwealth Games silver medallists for Kenya
Commonwealth Games medallists in athletics
People from Baringo County
Kenyan male cross country runners
Medallists at the 2002 Commonwealth Games